Hope is the third album by Finnish melodic death metal / doom metal band Swallow the Sun. It was released February 7, 2007.

The Horror tetralogy continues from this album, first being on The Morning Never Came, then New Moon, & finally on Emerald Forest and the Blackbird.

The Limited Edition version includes "These Low lands" a Timo Rautiainen & Trio Niskalaukaus cover that is originally named "Alavilla mailla", Swallow the Sun translated the song into English for this version.

Track listing

Credits

Swallow the Sun
Mikko Kotamäki - lead vocals
Markus Jämsen - lead guitar 
Juha Raivio - rhythm guitar; songwriting (1-8) 
Matti Honkonen - bass guitar 
Aleksi Munter - keyboards; keyboard recording, engineering
Pasi Pasanen - drums

Production staff
Sami Kokko - engineering, mixing, production, recording (Vocals, Guitars & Drums)
Hannu Honkonen - engineering, co-keyboards recording
Minerva Pappi - mastering

Songwriters (9)
 Timo Rautiainen & Trio Niskalaukaus

Guest vocalists

Co-vocalists
Jonas Renkse - (3)
Tomi Joutsen -  (9)

Backing vocalists
Tinuviel	- (2, 4, 8)
Jaani Peuhu - (4)

Album inlay designers
Tero Salonen - art direction
Viara Gentchev - logo
Sean Elliot - cover art
Jarmo Katila	- band photography

Chart positions

References

Swallow the Sun albums
2007 albums